Karachev is an ancient town and the administrative center of Karachevsky District in Bryansk Oblast, Russia. Population:

History

First chronicled in 1146, it was the capital of one of the Upper Oka Principalities in the Middle Ages, until its rulers moved their seat to Peremyshl. Karachev was part of Oryol Governorate from 1796 to 1920. Its old architecture was heavily damaged during World War II. Karachev was occupied by the German Army from 6 October 1941 to 15 August 1943.

Administrative and municipal status
Within the framework of administrative divisions, Karachev serves as the administrative center of Karachevsky District. As an administrative division, it is, together with thirty-one rural localities, incorporated within Karachevsky District as Karachevsky Urban Administrative Okrug. As a municipal division, Karachevsky Urban Administrative Okrug is incorporated within Karachevsky Municipal District as Karachevskoye Urban Settlement.

Infrastructure

References

Notes

Sources

External links

Official website of Karachev 
Karachev Business Directory  

Cities and towns in Bryansk Oblast
Karachevsky Uyezd